"Sound of Freedom" is a song by French music producer and DJ Bob Sinclar. It was released on April 2, 2007 as the lead single from his studio album Soundz of Freedom. The song features Gary Pine and Dollarman.

Content
It also contains an interpolation of "Everybody's Free (To Feel Good)" by Rozalla.

Charts

Weekly charts

Year-end charts

See also
 List of number-one dance singles of 2007 (U.S.)

Notes and references

Bob Sinclar songs
2007 singles
Yellow Productions singles
Songs written by Bob Sinclar
2007 songs
Ministry of Sound singles